Minuscule 751 (in the Gregory-Aland numbering), ε380 (von Soden), is a Greek minuscule manuscript of the New Testament written on parchment. Palaeographically it has been assigned to the 13th century. The manuscript has no complex contents. Scrivener labelled it as 739e.

Description 

Originally the codex contained the text of the Gospels. To the present time survived only 19 parchment leaves (size ). It has only text of Matthew 2:13-9:17.

The text is written in one column per page, 47 lines per page.

There is also another division according to the smaller Ammonian Sections, with a references to the Eusebian Canons.

Text 

Aland did not place the Greek text of the codex in any Category.

It was not examined according to the Claremont Profile Method.

History 

Scrivener and Gregory dated the manuscript to the 13th century. The manuscript is currently dated by the INTF to the 13th century.

It was added to the list of New Testament manuscripts by Scrivener (739) and Gregory (751). It was examined and described by Paulin Martin. Gregory saw the manuscript in 1885.

The manuscript is now housed at the Bibliothèque nationale de France (Suppl. Gr. 919) in Paris.

See also 

 List of New Testament minuscules
 Biblical manuscript
 Textual criticism
 Minuscule 750

References

Further reading 

 

Greek New Testament minuscules
13th-century biblical manuscripts
Bibliothèque nationale de France collections